The Kalamazoo Psychiatric Hospital (KRPH) is the largest mental health institution in Michigan. It was built under the Kirkbride Plan.

History

The Kalamazoo Regional Psychiatric Hospital officially opened on 29 August 1859 under the direction of Dr. Edwin Van Deusen, although three women patients had been admitted prior to that time. The first male patient was admitted in 1860.  It was originally known as the 'Michigan Asylum for the Insane' and was renamed the 'Kalamazoo State Hospital' in 1911.  Its name was changed to the 'Kalamazoo Regional Psychiatric Hospital' on 1 January 1978 and in July 1995 it assumed its present designation, the 'Kalamazoo Psychiatric Hospital'.  Many local residents commonly referred it simply as the 'State Hospital'.

The facility has continuously expanded and now stretches almost  along Oakland Drive, which was originally known as Asylum Avenue.  It is bounded by Howard Street on the south, and by the campus of Western Michigan University on the north. Almost all the original and historic buildings have been demolished and new, modern ones have been built in their place. This includes the original hospital building, which originally was covered with vines and had a more pleasant appearance.

The water tower was designed by B.F. Stratton and was constructed in 1895 by contractor Benjamin Roe. It quickly became a local landmark and played prominently in the history of the city. Later, a former state tuberculosis sanatorium on Blakeslee was taken over by the hospital and utilized for the treatment and care of elderly patients.

Another landmark on the main campus is the 'gate cottage' situated near Oakland Drive at the entrance to the hospital grounds. The gatehouse is  'carpenter gothic' in style, featuring board and batten siding, a steep roof and 'gingerbread' ornamentation. The house had been furnished with Victorian furniture and now serves as a museum. When first built, it was used as the porter's residence and later housed 12 women patients for a time.

Malcolm X's mother, Louise Little, was committed to the Kalamazoo State Hospital in 1938 after suffering a nervous breakdown and was not released until 1963.

Cornelia B. Wilbur, an American psychiatrist and educator, was the first female medical student extern at the hospital.

See also
Kalamazoo State Hospital Water Tower

References

Hospital buildings completed in 1859
Psychiatric hospitals in Michigan
Kirkbride Plan hospitals
Buildings and structures in Kalamazoo, Michigan
Hospitals established in 1859